Ikun-Mari was a king (Lugal) of the second Mariote kingdom. His name was recorded on a stone jar mentioning his wife "Alma". The script's style on the jar suggest a date later than the reign of the Mariote king Ikun-Shamash but earlier than the reign of king Isqi-Mari.

Queen Alma is mentioned in Eblaite texts that also mention the Mariote king Nizi and princes (later kings) Enna-Dagan and Hidar.

Citations

Kings of Mari